TC 2000 is a 1993 science fiction action film directed by T. J. Scott and starring Bolo Yeung, Jalal Merhi, Billy Blanks, Bobbie Phillips, Matthias Hues, Harry Mok, and Kelly Gallant. The film was written by T.J. Scott from a story by J. Stephen Maunder and Richard M. Samuels and produced by Merhi. The soundtrack was composed by VaRouje.

Plot 
In 2020, ecological disaster has driven the wealthy to an underground city.  Jason Storm is part of an elite security force called the Tracker-Communicators who protect the city against the surface world survivors who could not afford to escape.  Zoey Kinsella, the deceased founder's daughter, joins him as his rookie partner.  After a raid by starving surface world survivors breaches the city's force field, Zoey comes to believe they have inside help.  Storm acknowledges the possibility but is more concerned with his clashes against the Controller, the leader of the city's security, and his enforcer, Bigalow.  The Controller wants to use a  cybernetic project to replace the Tracker-Communicators, but he can not find any volunteers!

Niki Picasso and his gang penetrate the underground city's force field and head directly to a disused area of the city.  There, in a hidden cache, they find ammunition and an automatic rifle, a weapon that has become extremely rare.  While Picasso pins down Storm and Kinsella, an unseen adversary shoots Kinsella dead.  Convinced of a coverup, Storm angrily resigns, only to have the Controller send Bigalow to kill him.  When Storm escapes the city, the Controller frames him for Kinsella's death and sets the security forces after him.  Unknown to Storm, the Controller has Kinsella resurrected as a cyborg and programs her to be his personal assassin.  Her first mission is to seduce Picasso and recruit him to take over a research facility guarded by the Lifers, a powerful gang.

On the surface world, Storm encounters a martial arts master, Sumai, and his daughter.  Sumai helps Storm infiltrate Picasso's lair, but the cybernetic Kinsella easily defeats Storm.  As Storm recovers, Sumai trains him.  Sumai, former head of security at the research facility, tells Storm that Kinsella's father was the person who founded it.  The facility was originally meant to counter the ecological damage but was converted into a chemical weapons factory.  Suspecting that the Controller seeks the biological weapons to take over the surface world, Storm and Sumai recruit fighters who are willing to stand up to Picasso.  As Picasso overpowers the Lifers with his rifle, the Controller murders the city's leader, the Overlord, and joins him.

After launching the chemical weapons, the Controller double-crosses Picasso.  As the Controller flees the facility, Picasso confronts and kills him, though he is now, most unfortunately, left trapped in a silo.  The chemicals, though currently inert, will kill every surface dweller unless a countdown is aborted.  After defeating Bigalow and his men, Storm and Sumai break into the control room, where the Controller has left Kinsella.  Storm helps her to remember her true self, and she guesses several passwords.  Finally, with time running out, Sumai guesses the correct password and saves the surface world.  Picasso calls for help; when they ignore him, he vows revenge.

Cast

Release 
The film was released directly to video on August 18, 1993, by MCA/Universal Home Video in the United States, and in Canada that same year by Cineplex Odeon. A DVD is available in the UK. Vinegar Syndrome released the film onto Blu-Ray in 2021.

Reception 
TV Guide rated TC 2000 2/4 stars and wrote that while the non-stop martial arts action "can be tiresome", the film does a good job of showcasing Blanks.

References

External links 
 
 

Canadian direct-to-video films
1990s science fiction action films
American direct-to-video films
American science fiction action films
Karate films
Martial arts science fiction films
Canadian science fiction action films
English-language Canadian films
Films directed by T. J. Scott
1993 direct-to-video films
1993 films
Films set in 2020
1990s English-language films
1990s American films
1990s Canadian films